Ángel Luis Ríos Matos (born October 5, 1956) is a Puerto Rican born American prelate priest of the Catholic Church who has been serving as bishop of the Diocese of Mayagüez in Puerto Rico since 2020.

Biography
Ángel Ríos Matos was born on October 5, 1956, in Aguada, Puerto Rico.  He received a  Bachelor of Philosophy degree from the Pontifical Catholic University of Puerto Rico in Ponce, Puerto Rico.  He later obtained Bachelor of Theology degree from Pontifical Xavierian University in Bogotá, Colombia and a Doctor of Canon Law degree from the same university. 

On January 11, 1985, Ríos Matos was ordained to the priesthood for the Diocese of Mayagüez by Bishop Ulises Aurelio Casiano Vargas. Pope Francis appointed Ríos Matos as bishop for the Diocese of Mayagüez on May 9, 2020.   On August 1, 2020, Ríos Matos was consecrated and installed as bishop by Bishop Álvaro Corrada del Río

See also

 Catholic Church hierarchy
 Catholic Church in the United States
 Historical list of the Catholic bishops of Puerto Rico
 Historical list of the Catholic bishops of the United States
 List of Catholic bishops of the United States
 Lists of patriarchs, archbishops, and bishops

References

External links
Roman Catholic Diocese of Mayaguez  (Official Site in Spanish)

Episcopal succession

 

1956 births 
Living people
American Roman Catholic priests
Bishops appointed by Pope Francis
People from Aguada, Puerto Rico
Pontifical Catholic University of Puerto Rico alumni
Pontifical Xavierian University alumni
Puerto Rican Roman Catholic bishops
Roman Catholic bishops of Mayaguez